Gweunydd Blaencleddau is a large wetland complex in a shallow south-west valley around the headwaters of the Eastern Cleddau river. It is a Site of Special Scientific Interest (SSSI) and a Special Area of Conservation (SAC) situated in Pembrokeshire, South Wales.

Site of Special Scientific Interest
The site was designated an SSSI in 2000 for its biological qualities. It is a mixture of wet heath and damp grassland and has significant populations of the marsh fritillary (Euphydryas aurinia) and the southern damselfly (Coenagrion mercuriale).

Special Area of Conservation
A Special Area of Conservation has also been established around this north-eastern tributary of the Eastern Cleddau river. The site is designated for habitats including calcium-rich springwater-fed fens - Alkaline fens; the southern damselfly  (Coenagrion mercuriale); marsh fritillary butterfly Euphydryas (Eurodryas, Hypodryas) aurinia; purple moor-grass meadows - molinia meadows on calcareous, peaty or clayey-silt-laden soils (Molinion caeruleae); wet heathland with cross-leaved heath Rhostiroedd gwlyb - Northern Atlantic wet heaths with Erica tetralix; very wet mires often identified by an unstable 'quaking' surface - transition mires and quaking bogs; and blanket bogs.

See also
List of Sites of Special Scientific Interest in Pembrokeshire

References

External links
SSSI & SAC links from Natural Resources Wales
SAC entry
SAC map
SSSI citation
SSSI map
SSSI management plan

Sites of Special Scientific Interest in Pembrokeshire